Shakhty is a city in Rostov Oblast, Russia, located on the southeastern spur of the Donetsk mountain ridge,  northeast of Rostov-on-Don. As of the 2010 Census, its population was 239,987.

It was previously known as Alexandro-Grushevskaya (until 1867), Gornoye Grushevskoye Poseleniye (until 1881), Alexandrovsk-Grushevsky (until 1920).

History
In the beginning of the 19th century sergeant-major Popov founded on the Grushevka River a Cossack stanitsa of Alexandro-Grushevskaya. While the exact reasoning behind this name is unclear, it is possible that the name was given in honor of Emperor Alexander I. Twelve Cossacks and fourteen peasant serfs lived in the stanitsa at that time. By the mid-19th century, fifty-seven coal mines operated in this area. In 1867, it was granted town status and renamed Gornoye Grushevskoye Poseleniye. The name was changed to Alexandrovsk-Grushevsky in 1881.

By 1914, the population had reached 54,000. The main source of income was coal mining, which had been carried out in that region since the end of the 18th century. The population was poor, but the town had rail, telegraph and telephone networks, electricity and plumbing as well as libraries, hospitals and a post office. 1917 saw the city change hands three times, until it was taken on April 28, 1919, by the Don Army, under General . For twenty months it was independent of the Bolsheviks, but was ravaged by typhoid.

In 1920, the city was given its present name. The name, which literally means mines in Russian, was chosen due to the strong association with coal mining. In 1920–24 Shakhty was part of Donetsk Governorate of the Ukrainian SSR. During the 1920s, many of the churches and the archives were destroyed. In 1928, the city was the location of the Shakhty Trial, a precursor of the show trials of the 1930s.

In 1941, an independent Cossack republic had been declared in Shakhty although this was suppressed by the NKVD before the Russian invasion. In July 22,  1942, during the Great Patriotic War, the city was occupied by the Germans; many coal pits and buildings were blown up by the Germans during their retreat in February 12, 1943. Twenty-nine of the townsmen were awarded the title of the Hero of the Soviet Union.

In 1948, production levels in the mines reached what they had been before the war. During the Leonid Brezhnev years, the city was at the height of its development, with a population of over 250,000, and about ten million tons of coal being mined each year.

In the 1970s and 1980s, the city was the scene of many of Andrei Chikatilo's murders.

Perestroika proved devastating for the city, as mines were privatized and shut down, causing massive unemployment, which led to a severe rise in crime and drug abuse. Today's Shakhty is the main industrial center of the Eastern Donbas. The city is also one of the main producers and exporters of tile in Eastern Europe.

Administrative and municipal status
Within the framework of administrative divisions, it is incorporated as Shakhty Urban Okrug—an administrative unit with the status equal to that of the districts. As a municipal division, this administrative unit also has urban okrug status.

Demographics
The city's population was 239,987 as of the 2010 Census; up from 222,592 recorded in the 2002 Census. As of the 1989 Census, the population was 225,797.

Attractions

There are many monuments and museums In Shakhty.

 Monument to Alexander II. The monument to Emperor Alexander II was opened on April 29, 2015. It was placed in front of the main building of the Institute of Service and Entrepreneurship of Don State Technological Institute (DSTU) in the city of Shakhty. The monument was built on voluntary donations. The right to hold its opening was given to a representative of the house of Romanov, the great-grandson of Emperor Alexander III, Pavel Eduardovich Kulikovsky-Romanov.

The pedestal is made of dark granite, and the statue of Alexander II, cast in bronze. The height of the monument is 5.7 meters, and the figure of Alexander II is 2.4 meters.

On the front side there is the inscription in gold letters that reads "Alexander II. Tsar the Liberator. " From the back, there is a brief biographical note on the ruler: "Emperor Alexander II abolished serfdom in Russia in 1861 and freed millions of peasants from centuries of slavery, conducted military and judicial reforms, introduced the system of local self-government, city dumas and local administrations, brought to the end the long-lasting Caucasian War, and liberated the Slavic peoples from the Ottoman yoke. He was killed on March 1, 1881 and was a victim of a terrorist. 

The monument was erected on the initiative of the Historic council of the city of Shakhty. The sculptor is Yuri Alekseevich Levochkin.
 Monument to Vasily Alexeyev (2014). Vasily Ivanovich Alekseyev  was a Soviet weightlifter. He set 80 world records and 81 Soviet records in weightlifting and won gold medals at the 1972 and 1976 Summer Olympics. Alexeev was born in the city Shakhty.
 Monument to Soldier-liberator (1985)
 Memorial to the Victims of Fascism (1975)
 Monument to the fighters for Soviet power (1955)
 Monument to soldiers-internazionalista (2010)
 Monument to Taras Shevchenko (1972)
 Monuments to Lenin (1945).  Vladimir Ilyich Ulyanov was a Russian communist revolutionary, politician and political theorist.
 A memorial to the heroes of the first world war (2014). On the monument depicts a double-headed eagle. In his paws cadet standard, with the monogram of the Russian Emperor Nicholas II. On the plates under the wings of the eagle is engraved the names of all of the Don Cossack units that participated in the First World War.

Twin towns – sister cities

Shakhty is twinned with:
 Armavir, Armenia
 Gelsenkirchen, Germany
 Nikopol, Bulgaria
 Sievierodonetsk, Ukraine

Notable people
Vasily Alexeyev (born 1942), weightlifter
Lyudmila Kondratyeva (born 1958), sprinter
Alina Ermolova (born 2001), rhythmic gymnast
Marina Logvinenko (born 1961), sport shooter
Alexander Nevolin-Svetov (born 1988), Paralympic swimmer

References

Notes

Sources

Е. М. Поспелов (Ye. M. Pospelov). "Имена городов: вчера и сегодня (1917–1992). Топонимический словарь." (City Names: Yesterday and Today (1917–1992). Toponymic Dictionary.) Москва, "Русские словари", 1993.

External links
Official website of Shakhty 
Unofficial website of Shakhty 

Cities and towns in Rostov Oblast
Don Host Oblast